Thomas Smith (1745 – March 31, 1809) was a politician and jurist from Pennsylvania.  Smith was born near Cruden, Aberdeenshire, Scotland.  He attended the University of Edinburgh, and then migrated to the United States, where he settled in Bedford, Pennsylvania on February 9, 1769.  He became a deputy surveyor that same year.    Smith then studied law, was admitted to the bar, and began practicing as a lawyer in 1772.   He became a deputy register of wills and prothonotary in 1773, and a justice of the peace in 1774.

When the Revolutionary War broke out, Smith served as a deputy colonel of militia.  He was a delegate to Pennsylvania's constitutional convention in 1776, and elected as a member of the Pennsylvania House of Representatives from 1776 until 1780.  Smith was then chosen to be a delegate to the Continental Congress from 1781 to 1782.  He was later a judge of the court of common pleas in 1791, and finally on the Supreme Court of Pennsylvania from 1794 until 1809.  Smith died in Philadelphia and was buried in Christ Church Burial Ground.

When serving as a justice on the Supreme Court of Pennsylvania, Smith was impeached on flimsy political grounds on March 23, 1804 by the Democratic–Republican-led Pennsylvania House of Representatives alongside the other two Federalist justices of the Supreme Court, Edward Shippen IV and Jasper Yeates. The sole Democratic–Republican member of the court, who had been not in attendance on the day the court heard the case central to the impeachment, was not impeached. The justices were not removed, being acquitted in their impeachment trial before the Pennsylvania Senate in the vote held on January 28, 1805.

References

External links

Justices of the Supreme Court of Pennsylvania
Continental Congressmen from Pennsylvania
18th-century American politicians
Pennsylvania militiamen in the American Revolution
Members of the Pennsylvania House of Representatives
Pennsylvania lawyers
1745 births
1809 deaths
People from Buchan
Alumni of the University of Edinburgh
United States judges impeached by state or territorial governments